The Gold Walkley is the major award of the Walkley Awards for Australian journalism. It is chosen by the Walkley Advisory Board from the winners of all the other categories (excluding the Journalism Leadership and Most Outstanding Contribution to Journalism awards). It has been awarded annually since 1978.

List of award winners

References 

Australian journalism awards
 Gold Walkley
Awards established in 1979